OK, Good is an American independent film directed by Daniel Martinico.  The film stars Hugo Armstrong as Paul Kaplan, a struggling actor on the verge of a breakdown.

Release
OK, Good premiered at the 2012 Slamdance Film Festival, and made its international debut at the 59th Annual Sydney Film Festival.  It subsequently screened at the Atlanta Film Festival, the Independent Film Festival of Boston, the New Orleans Film Festival, Raindance, and the Chicago Underground Film Festival, among others.

The film is set to be distributed by Slamdance Studios in partnership with Cinedigm, with wide VOD release scheduled for November 5, 2013.

References

External links
Official website

2012 films
American independent films
Films about actors
Films set in Los Angeles
2010s English-language films
2010s American films